Warner Music Czech Republic (formerly EMI Czech Republic and Parlophone Czech Republic) is a record label based in the Czech Republic. The company was founded under the name Monitor in 1990. EMI purchased the label in 1994 and maintained it under the name Monitor/EMI s.r.o. Later, the label was renamed EMI Czech Republic s.r.o. It was sold to the Warner Music Group in 2013, with EMI labels, for £487 million.

References

External links
 

1990 establishments in Czechoslovakia
Czech record labels
EMI
Warner Music labels